Sinoxylon unidentatum, the conifer auger beetle, is a species of horned powder-post beetle in the family Bostrichidae. It is found in Africa, North America, Oceania, South America, and Southern Asia.

References

Further reading

External links

 

Bostrichidae
Articles created by Qbugbot
Beetles described in 1801